Matila Vocea (born 18 June 2000) is a Fijian netball player who plays for her home country in the position of goal attack or goal shooter. She was included in the Fijian squad for the 2019 Netball World Cup, which was also her first appearance at a Netball World Cup.

References 

2000 births
Living people
Fijian netball players
2019 Netball World Cup players
People educated at Suva Grammar School
Queensland state netball league players
21st-century Fijian women